Lake Wilderness is a census-designated place in Spotsylvania County, Virginia. The population as of the 2010 Census was 2,669. It is flanked on three sides by the Wilderness Battlefield section of the Fredericksburg and Spotsylvania National Military Park.

References

Census-designated places in Spotsylvania County, Virginia
Census-designated places in Virginia